Vanessa Victoria Friedman (born December 4, 1967) is Fashion Director and Chief Fashion Critic at The New York Times. Previously, Friedman has worked at numerous other publications including the Financial Times, the New Yorker, American Vogue, and Vanity Fair.

Immediately preceding her appointment at the Financial Times, Friedman was the features and fashion features editor of InStyle, when the title was launched in the United Kingdom in 2000. Prior to this, she was an arts contributor for The Economist and the European editor-at-large for US Elle.

Education
Friedman is Jewish and was born in New York to Stephen J. Friedman, a lawyer, and Fredrica Friedman, a literary manager. She has a younger brother named Alexander. 
Friedman graduated cum laude from Princeton University where she studied history, European cultural studies, and creative writing. She is also a graduate of Phillips Exeter Academy and The Chapin School.

Career
In 1998, Friedman was published in The New Yorker. She was the Fashion Features Director for InStyle UK, a position she held from 2000 to 2002. Prior to this, she worked as a Fashion Correspondent for the FT, as an Arts Contributor at The Economist and was the European Editor at Elle US. She has also written extensively on a freelance basis for Entertainment Weekly, Vogue, The New Yorker and Vanity Fair.

From 2002 to March 2014, Friedman was the fashion editor of the Financial Times. She is the first person to hold the post. Friedman writes a weekly column for the Saturday FT, as well as editing the Style page, and helps cover the luxury industry for the daily newspaper, and edits the twice-yearly supplement The Business of Fashion. 

In March 2014, Friedman was named the "fashion director and chief fashion critic" of The New York Times.

Personal life
Friedman married J. David Stewart in New York City, on June 15, 1996. They live together with their 3 children and two cats in Park Slope, Brooklyn.

References

External links

Who Comments? - Vanessa Friedman

Living people
1968 births
British columnists
English journalists
Fashion editors
Financial Times people
Chapin School (Manhattan) alumni
Phillips Exeter Academy alumni
Princeton University alumni